Aynsley Thomas Dunbar (born 10 January 1946) is an English drummer. He has worked with John Mayall, Frank Zappa, Jeff Beck, Journey, Jefferson Starship, Nils Lofgren, Eric Burdon,  Shuggie Otis, Ian Hunter, Lou Reed, David Bowie, Mick Ronson, Whitesnake, Pat Travers, Sammy Hagar, Michael Schenker, UFO, Michael Chapman, Jake E. Lee, Leslie West, Kathi McDonald, Keith Emerson, Mike Onesko, Herbie Mann and Flo & Eddie. Dunbar was inducted into the Rock and Roll Hall of Fame as a member of Journey in 2017.

Career
Aynsley Thomas Dunbar was born in Liverpool, England. He started his professional career in Derry Wilkie and the Pressmen in 1963. In December 1964 he joined Merseybeat group the Mojos, who were renamed Stu James & the Mojos, with original members vocalist Stu James and guitarist Nick Crouch and bass player Lewis Collins (later an actor in The Professionals). This line-up continued until 1966. Dunbar then auditioned for the Jimi Hendrix Experience and Hendrix had difficulty deciding between Dunbar and Mitch Mitchell – the latter won Hendrix's coin flip. Dunbar then joined John Mayall's Bluesbreakers replacing Hughie Flint. He stayed with Mayall until the spring of 1967 (playing on the A Hard Road album), and was replaced by Mick Fleetwood.

After a short stint in the Jeff Beck Group, Dunbar founded 'the Aynsley Dunbar Retaliation', so named to chide Mayall, who had fired him. They issued four albums during their existence. Dunbar co-wrote the song "Warning" (later recorded by Black Sabbath on their first album). The Dunbar single version was recorded in 1967 for the Blue Horizon label, prior to his band's first album release The Aynsley Dunbar Retaliation (1968).

Subsequently, Dunbar founded a short-lived progressive rock band called Blue Whale, which debuted with a tour of Scandinavia in January 1970. Following the recent collapse of the original lineup of King Crimson, Dunbar unsuccessfully tried to recruit Robert Fripp as Blue Whale's guitarist. Fripp, in turn, unsuccessfully tried to recruit Dunbar as King Crimson's new drummer. Blue Whale recorded one album, which featured Paul Williams (vocals), Ivan Zagni (guitar), Roger Sutton (guitar), Tommy Eyre (from Retaliation, keys) and Peter Friedberg (bass).

Dunbar was later the drummer for Frank Zappa, playing  on the solo albums Apostrophe (') and Waka/Jawaka, and the Mothers' albums The Grand Wazoo and Fillmore East – June 1971, as well as the film 200 Motels. He filled in for Flo and Eddie when they left the Zappa group after an irate British "fan" pushed Zappa off the Rainbow stage in 1971. In 1974 he played on the soundtrack of Dirty Duck, an adult animated film directed by Charles Swenson. In the mid-1970s Dunbar played drums for former Grin leader, Nils Lofgren, before joining Journey for their first four albums. He joined Jefferson Starship for three albums. On 28 December 1978, he played at Winterland in San Francisco with the Tubes. Dunbar joined Whitesnake in 1985 and performed on their 1987 album, Whitesnake. He also spent some time working with Pat Travers, Eric Burdon, UFO, Michael Schenker, Mogg/Way and the Animals.

He has been the drummer for the World Classic Rockers since 2003. In 2005, he drummed on Jake E. Lee's solo Retraced album.

In 2008 Dunbar recorded an album of material for Direct Music with Mickey Thomas of Starship, and musicians such as Jake E. Lee, former guitarist for Ozzy Osbourne. The complete recordings of Dunbar's drumming with Frank Zappa at Carnegie Hall in October 1971 were released exactly 40 years after the event in a four-CD set.

In 2009 the blues album The Bluesmasters featuring Mickey Thomas was released, featuring Dunbar on drums along with Tim Tucker on guitar and Danny Miranda on bass as well as guest stars such as Magic Slim on guitar and vocals.

Drummerworld recognized Dunbar as the only drummer to have played with such a robust variety of successful bands and musicians. In 2017 Aynsley was inducted into the Rock and Roll Hall of Fame as a member of Journey. Dunbar was ranked by Rolling Stone as 27th greatest drummer of all time.

Personal life 
Dunbar's youngest son Dash was diagnosed with cancer in June 1999 and died on 9 May 2000.

Discography

With John Mayall & the Bluesbreakers
 A Hard Road (1967)
 Looking Back (1969)
 So Many Roads (1969)
 Thru the Years (1971)

With Eddie Boyd
 Eddie Boyd and His Blues Band Featuring Peter Green (1967)

With Michael Chapman
Rainmaker  (1969)

The Aynsley Dunbar Retaliation
 The Aynsley Dunbar Retaliation (July 1968)
 Doctor Dunbar's Prescription (December 1968)
 To Mum, From Aynsley & The Boys (Oct 1969)
 Remains to Be Heard (May 1970)
 Watchin' Chain (unknown; BYG 529501)

With Blue Whale
 Blue Whale (1971)

With Frank Zappa and the Mothers
 Chunga's Revenge (1970)
 Fillmore East - June 1971 (1971)
 200 Motels (1971)
 Just Another Band from L.A. (1972)
 Waka/Jawaka (1972)
 The Grand Wazoo (1972)
 Apostrophe (') (1974)
 You Can%27t Do That on Stage Anymore, Vol. 1 (1988)
 You Can%27t Do That on Stage Anymore, Vol. 3 (1991)
 You Can%27t Do That on Stage Anymore, Vol. 6 (1992)
 Playground Psychotics (1992)
 The Lost Episodes (1996)
 Joe%27s Domage (2004)
 Quaudiophiliac (2004)
 Carnegie Hall (2011)
 Finer Moments (2012)
 Road Tapes, Venue 3 (2016)
 The Mothers 1970 (2020)
 Zappa - Original Motion Picture Soundtrack (2021)

With Shuggie Otis
 Freedom Flight (1971)

With Flo & Eddie
 The Phlorescent Leech & Eddie (album) (1972)
 Flo & Eddie (album) (1973)

With David Bowie
Pin Ups (1973)
Diamond Dogs (1974)

With Lou Reed
Berlin (1973)

With Herbie Mann
London Underground (Atlantic, 1973)

With Ava Cherry and the Astronettes
People from Bad Homes  (1973)

With Kathi McDonald
Insane Asylum  (1974)

With Mick Ronson
Slaughter on 10th Avenue (1974)
Play Don't Worry (1975)

With Nils Lofgren
Nils Lofgren (1975)
Cry Tough (1976)

With Ian Hunter
All American Alien Boy (1976)

With Journey
Journey (1975)
Look into the Future (1976)
Next (1977)
Infinity (1978)

With Sammy Hagar
Nine on a Ten Scale (1976)

With Jefferson Starship
Freedom at Point Zero (1979)
Modern Times (1981)
Winds of Change (1982)

With Paul Kantner
Planet Earth Rock and Roll Orchestra (1983)

With Whitesnake
 Whitesnake (1987)
 1987 Versions (1987)

With Ronnie Montrose
 The Diva Station (1990)

With Pat Travers
Just a Touch  (1992)
Blues Magnet  (1994)
P.T. Power Trio  (2003)

With Mogg/Way
Edge of the World (1997)

With Mother's Army
Fire on the Moon (1998)

With Michael Schenker
The Unforgiven (1998)
Adventures of the Imagination (2000)

With UFO
 Covenant (2000)
 Sharks (2002)

With Leslie West
 Blues to Die For (2003)

With Jake E. Lee
Retraced (2005)

With Keith Emerson
Off the Shelf (2006)

Aynsley Dunbar
 Mutiny' ' (2008).

Bibliography
 Bob Brunning (1986) Blues: The British Connection, London: Helter Skelter, 2002, 
 Dick Heckstall-Smith (2004) The Safest Place in the World: A Personal History of British Rhythm and blues, Clear Books,   – First Edition : Blowing The Blues – Fifty Years Playing The British Blues Christopher Hjort Strange Brew: Eric Clapton and the British Blues Boom, 1965–1970, foreword by John Mayall, Jawbone (2007) 
 Paul Myers: Long John Baldry and the Birth of the British Blues, Vancouver 2007 – GreyStone Books
 Harry Shapiro Alexis Korner: The Biography'', Bloomsbury Publishing PLC, London 1997, Discography by Mark Troster

References

External links

1946 births
Living people
English rock drummers
The Mothers of Invention members
John Mayall & the Bluesbreakers members
Journey (band) members
Whitesnake members
UFO (band) members
Jefferson Starship members
Charly Records artists
Musicians from Liverpool
English blues musicians
English session musicians
English expatriates in the United States
Glam rock musicians
The Jeff Beck Group members
Mother's Army members
World Classic Rockers members
Blue Thumb Records artists